The 1916 College Football All-Southern Team consists of American football players selected to the College Football All-Southern Teams selected by various organizations in 1916.

Georgia Tech posted the best SIAA record, and tied for the championship with Tennessee. Graham Vowell, Pup Phillips, and Irby Curry were selected for Walter Camp's third-team All-American. Both Curry and Tommy Spence would die in France serving the United States in the First World War.

Composite team

The composite All-Southern team formed by the selection of 4 newspapers included:
Walker Carpenter, tackle for Georgia Tech, starter for the 1916 team which, as one writer wrote, "seemed to personify Heisman." The season included the 222 to 0 defeat of Cumberland.
Josh Cody, tackle for Vanderbilt, inducted into the College Football Hall of Fame in 1970, only three-time All-American in Vanderbilt football history. He was selected for the Associated Press Southeast Area All-Time football team 1869-1919 era.  Third-team Camp All-American. Later a prominent football coach at many institutions.
Rabbit Curry, quarterback for Vanderbilt, was selected third-team All-American by Walter Camp. During the First World War, he was killed in aerial combat over France. He was a beloved player of Coach McGugin, described by one writer as "the player who has most appealed to the imagination, admiration, and affection of the entire university community through the years."
Bob Lang, guard for Georgia Tech, starter in the 222 to 0 win.  He was the first guard selected for the Heisman era All-Era Tech football team.
Chink Lowe, guard and captain-elect for Tennessee. He served in the First World War as a marine and earned the Distinguished Service Cross.
Pup Phillips, center for Georgia Tech, was selected third-team All-American by Walter Camp. The first Tech center to be selected All-Southern.
Doc Rodes, halfback for Kentucky, a team which defeated Centre 68–0 and finished the season with an upset – a scoreless tie with SIAA co-champion Tennessee. Kentucky's only loss came against Vanderbilt. Vanderbilt coach Dan McGugin stated "If you would give me Doc Rodes, I would say he was a greater player than Curry."
Tommy Spence, fullback for Georgia Tech, scored second most behind Strupper in the 222 to 0 win. Spence, like Curry, was also a casualty of the First World War over French skies. He is the namesake of Spence Air Base.
Everett Strupper, halfback for Georgia Tech, inducted into the College Football Hall of Fame in 1972. He was deaf and scored the most in the 222 to 0 win.
Graham Vowell, end and captain for Tennessee, the lone unanimous selection. He was also selected third-team All-American by Walter Camp. After football, he worked in the lumber business.

Composite overview

All-Southerns of 1916

Ends
Graham Vowell†, Tennessee (C, NTC, DJ, H, MB, BH-1, HS, FB, EC, KS, WGF-1, BP)
Lloyd Wolfe, Tennessee (C, NTC, BH-2, EC, KS, WGF-2)
Red Jones, Auburn (C, BH-1)
Si Bell, Georgia Tech (C, FB)
Neil Edmond, Sewanee (BH-2, BP)
Harry E. Clark, Sewanee (WGF-2)

Tackles

Josh Cody, Vanderbilt (College Football Hall of Fame) (C, NTC, DJ [as e], H, MB, BH-1, HS, EC, WGF-1, BP)
Walker Carpenter, Georgia Tech (C, NTC, DJ, H, MB, BH-1, EC, WGF-1)
Ike Rogers, Alabama (C, HS [as e], FB)
Phillip Cooper, LSU (C, DJ, BH-2)
Tom Thrash, Georgia (C, WGF-2)
Morris Vowell, Tennessee (EC)
Tom Lipscomb, Vanderbilt (WGF-2)

Guards
Bob Lang, Georgia Tech (C, NTC DJ, H, BH-1, HS, WGF-1)
William O. "Chink" Lowe, Tennessee (C, BH-2, HS, FB, EC, KS, WGF-2)
Pryor Williams, Vanderbilt (C, NTC, H, MB, BH-1, BP)
Moon Ducote, Auburn (C, H [as e], BH-2 [as t], HS [as t], FB, WGF-2, BP [as t])
Charlie Carman, Vanderbilt (C, BH-2, EC, BP)
 Garmany, Georgia (MB, KS)
P. C. Hambaugh, Tennessee (WGF-1)

Center
Pup Phillips, Georgia Tech (C, NTC, DJ, H, MB, BH-1, HS, EC, KS)
Carey Robinson, Auburn (C, DJ [as g], MB [as e], BH-2, FB, WGF-1 [as e], BP)
Kirby Lee Spurlock, Mississippi A&M (WGF-2)

Quarterbacks
Rabbit Curry, Vanderbilt (C, NTC, H, MB [as hb], BH-1, HS, FB, EC, KS [as hb], WGF-1, BP)
Froggie Morrison, Georgia Tech (C, DJ, MB, BH-2)

Halfbacks

Everett Strupper, Georgia Tech (College Football Hall of Fame) (C, NTC, DJ, H, MB, BH-1, HS, FB, KS, WGF-1)
Doc Rodes, Kentucky (C, NTC, H, BH-2, EC, KS [qb], WGF-1)
Red Floyd, Vanderbilt (C, BH-2, HS, FB)
Bill Folger, North Carolina (C, DJ)
Cecil Creen, Alabama (C, EC)
Eben Wortham, Sewanee (BH-1, WGF-2 [as qb])
Owen Reynolds, Georgia (BP)
Homer Prendergast, Auburn (BP)
Talley Johnston, Georgia Tech (WGF-2)
H. F. Flannagan, LSU (WGF-2)

Fullbacks
Tommy Spence, Georgia Tech (C, NTC, DJ, H, MB, BH-1, HS, FB, WGF-1, BP)
Homer Prendergast, Auburn, (C)
Otto Schwill, Mississippi A&M (BH-2, KS, WGF-2)

Key
Bold = Composite selection

* = Consensus All-American

† = Unanimous selection

C = received at least one selection from a composite of 4 newspapers: The Atlanta Constitution, The Birmingham Age-Herald, The Knoxville Journal and Tribune, and The Nashville Tennessean.

NTC = Composite selection of the Nashville Tennessean.

DJ = Dick Jemison of the Atlanta Constitution. He had an "All-Southern" and an "All-SIAA" selection. The only difference was switching Eben Wortham at halfback for Folger.

H = John Heisman, coach at Georgia Institute of Technology.

MB = Morgan Blake of the Atlanta Journal.

BH = Blinkey Horn of the Nashville Tennessean.

HS = Hugh Sparrow, sporting editor for the Birmingham Ledger.

FB = Fred Boedeker in Birmingham Age-Herald

EC = Earl Crew in Knoxville Journal and Tribune

KS = Knoxville Sentinel

WGF = W. G. Foster in the Chattanooga Times

BP = Bob Pigue in Nashville Banner

See also
1916 College Football All-America Team

References

1916 Southern Intercollegiate Athletic Association football season
College Football All-Southern Teams